This is a list of Japanese Aircraft in use during the Second Sino-Japanese War. Allied nicknames are in quotes (").

Japanese Army Aircraft

Reconnaissance
Kawasaki Ki-88 (KDA-2)
Nakajima Ki-4
Mitsubishi Ki-15 "Babs"
Mitsubishi Ki-46 "Dinah"

Liaison/Training
Nakajima J.S.S.F.
Kokusai Ki-86 "Cypress"
Mansyu Ki-79
Nakajima Ki-27a-Kai & Ki-27b-Kai "Nate"
Tachikawa Ki-9 "Spruce"
Tachikawa Ki-17 "Cedar"
Tachikawa Ki-24
Tachikawa Ki-54 "Hickory" 
Tachikawa Ki-55 "Ida"

Light bombers
Kawasaki Ki-3
Mitsubishi Ki-2
Kawasaki Type 88 (KDA-2)
Kawasaki Ki-32 "Mary"
Mitsubishi Ki-30 "Ann"
Mitsubishi Ki-51 "Sonia"
Kawasaki Ki-48 "Lily"

Dive bombers
Nakajima Ki-4
Kawasaki Ki-32 "Mary"

Army land support
Tachikawa Ki-36 "Ida"

Ground attack
Rikugun Ki-93-Ib
Kawasaki Ki-102b "Randy"

Heavy bombers
Mitsubishi Ki-1
Mitsubishi Ki-2
Mitsubishi Ki-21 "Sally"
Fiat BR.20 Cicogna (85 examples)
Nakajima Ki-49 Donryu "Helen"
Mitsubishi Ki-67 Hiryu "Peggy"

Fighters
Nakajima Type 91(NC)
Kawasaki Ki-10 "Perry"
Nakajima Ki-27 "Nate" or "Abdul"
Nakajima Ki-43 Hayabusa "Oscar"
Nakajima Ki-44 Shoki "Tojo"
Kawasaki Ki-61 Hien "Tony"
Nakajima Ki-84 Hayate "Frank"

Heavy fighters
Kawasaki Ki-45 Toryu "Nick"
Kawasaki Ki-51 Tokyo "Sonia"
Kawasaki Ki-93 Toroku
Rikugun Ki-93-Ia
Kawasaki Ki-102a, Ki-102c "Randy"

Transports
Fokker/Nakajima Ki-6 "Super Universal"
Nakajima Ki-34 "Thora"
Mitsubishi Ki-57 "Topsy"
Kawasaki Ki-56 "Thalia"
Kokusai Ki-59 "Theresa"
Tachikawa Type LO "Thelma"
Tachikawa Ki-54 "Hickory"

Autogyro
Kayaba Ka-1

Japanese Navy Aircraft

Reconnaissance
Mitsubishi C5M "Babs"
Nakajima C6N Saiun "Myrt"

Reconnaissance Seaplanes
Nakajima E4N
Kawanishi E7K "Alf"
Nakajima E8N "Dave"
Watanabe E9W "Slim"
Aichi E10A "Hank"
Aichi E11A "Laura"
Aichi E13A "Jake"
Aichi E16A "Paul"
Yokosuka E14Y "Glen"
Mitsubishi F1M "Pete"

Dive bombers
Aichi D1A "Susie"
Aichi D3A "Val"
Yokosuka D4Y Suisei "Judy"
Aichi B7A Ryūsei "Grace"
Mitsubishi A6M7 model 62,63 Rei-Sen "Hamp"/"Zeke"

Flying boat
Kawanishi H6K "Mavis"
Kawanishi H8K "Emily"

Fighters
Nakajima A4N
Nakajima A6M2-N "Rufe"
Mitsubishi A5M "Claude"
Mitsubishi A6M Rei-Sen "Zero"
Heinkel He 112 (Japanese designation A7He1)
Mitsubishi A6M Zero Rei-Sen "Hamp"/"Zeke"
Nakajima J1N Gekko "Irving"
Mitsubishi J2M Raiden "Jack"
Kawanishi N1K Kyofu "Terry"

Escort Fighter
Seversky 2PA-B3 "Convoy Fighter" (Japanese design:A8V1) "Dick"

Torpedo Bombers
Mitsubishi B2M
Kugisho B3Y
Yokosuka B4Y "Jean"
Nakajima B5N "Kate"
Mitsubishi B5M "Mabel"
Nakajima B6N Tenzan "Jill"
Aichi B7A Ryūsei "Grace"
Mitsubishi G3M "Nell"
Mitsubishi G4M "Betty"
Yokosuka P1Y Ginga "Frances"
Mitsubishi Ki-67 Hiryu "Peggy"

Torpedo Bombers
Nakajima B5N "Kate"

Medium Bombers
Mitsubishi G3M "Nell"
Mitsubishi G4M "Betty"
Yokosuka P1Y Ginga "Frances"
Mitsubishi Ki-67 Yasukuni "Peggy"

Antisubmarine Patrol
Kyushu K11W Shiragiku
Kyushu Q1W Tokai "Lorna"

Transport
Kawanishi H6K2-L & H6K4-L "Mavis"
Kawanishi H8K1-L, H8K2-L & H8K4-L "Emily"
Nakajima C2N
Mitsubishi G6M1-L2
Mitsubishi K3M "Pine"
Mitsubishi L3Y "Tina"
Showa/Nakajima L2D "Tabby"

Trainer/Liaison
Aichi D3A2-K "Val"
Hitachi (Tokyo Gasu Denky) LXG
Kyushu K9W "Cypress" 
Kyushu K10W "Oak"
Kyushu K11W Shiragiku
Mitsubishi A5M4-K "Claude"
Mitsubishi A6M2-K & A6M5-K "Zeke"
Mitsubishi G6M1-K "Betty"
Nakajima B5N1-K "Kate"
Yokosuka K5Y "Willow"

See also
Aerial Engagements of the Second Sino-Japanese War
Development of Chinese Nationalist air force (1937-1945)
List of aircraft of Japan during World War II

References

Japanese aircraft
Second Sino-Japanese War, aircraft
Japanese, Second Sino-Japanese War